Alfred Papapreye Diete-Spiff (born 30 July 1942)  was the first Military Governor of Rivers State, Nigeria after it was created from part of the old Eastern Region, Nigeria. He held office from May 1967 until July 1975 during the military administration of General Yakubu Gowon.
He was also a member of the Supreme Military Council.

Diete-Spiff is an Ijaw from Bayelsa State and the Amayanabo (King) of Twon-Brass, Bayelsa State, born on 30 July 1942.
He was educated at St. Joseph's College in Western Cameroon and Britannia Royal Naval College in Dartmouth, England.
He joined the Nigerian Navy and was commissioned ships diving officer in 1964.
When appointed Military Governor of Rivers State in 1967, he was a Naval Lieutenant Commander aged 25.

In 1973, a correspondent for the Nigerian Observer wrote an article about an impending teacher's strike, which was published on Diete-Spiff's birthday. Taking this as a deliberate insult, Diete-Spiff's aide Ralph Iwowari had the reporter's head publicly shaved and had him beaten with 24 lashes of a cane.

In December 2009, Diete-Spiff was National Chairman of the Nigerian Association of Auctioneers.

He was in the 2005 Confab and served in the Committee on Models and Structure of Government.

He has a son who auditioned for Nigerian Idols Season 7.

Awards
In October 2022, a Nigerian national honour of Commander of the Order of the Federal Republic (CFR) was conferred on him by President Muhammadu Buhari.

References

1942 births
Living people
People from Bayelsa State
Ijaw people
Nigerian military governors of Rivers State
Nigerian Navy officers
Nigerian Navy personnel